Castelnau-le-Lez is a commune in the Hérault department in the Occitanie region of Southern France. Located on the outskirts of Montpellier, it is situated around 3 km (1.8 mi) north of the city centre. In 2017, it had a population of 20,480.

Geography

Castelnau-le-Lez is served by Line 2 of the Montpellier tramway.

Population

History
Hundreds of Jewish children were hidden in the town of Castelnau-le-Lez during the Holocaust. Almost every home hid children, in some cases from multiple families. After the war, the children whose parents had survived were returned to them. The people of the town and the local priest were well aware of the situation and, at least tacitly, supported it.

Twin towns
Castelnau-le-Lez is twinned with:

  Plankstadt, Germany
  Argenta, Emilia–Romagna, Italy
  San Fernando de Henares, Spain

See also
Communes of the Hérault department
Giant of Castelnau

References

Communes of Hérault